The 1914-15 season in Swedish football, starting August 1914 and ending July 1915:

Honours

Official titles

Competitions

Promotions, relegations and qualifications

Promotions

League transfers

Relegations

Domestic results

Svenska Serien 1914–15

Uppsvenska Serien 1915

Mellansvenska Serien 1914–15

Östsvenska Serien 1915

Västsvenska Serien 1914–15

Svenska Mästerskapet 1914 
Final

Kamratmästerskapen 1914 
Final

Wicanderska Välgörenhetsskölden 1914 
Final

National team results 

 Sweden: 

 Sweden: 

 Sweden:

National team players in season 1914/15

Notes

References 
Print

Online

 
Seasons in Swedish football